The population of Oslo is monitored by Statistics Norway. As of 2022, the population of Oslo sat at 702,543.

Population 
As of 2022, the population of Oslo sat at 702,543.

Number of immigrants
The current number of immigrants by country living in Oslo, Norway, as of 1 January 2017 are as follows;

Religion 
Religiously, the residents of Oslo are in a majority-minority state with the largest group religious group being adherents to the Lutheran Church of Norway, but these do not make up the majority of residents. Irreligious people make up 28.9% of the population with the largest other religious group being Islam which makes up 9.5% of the city.

See also
 Norwegian immigrant statistics

References
Oslo society
Oslo